Šiauliai International Airport  is an airport located within Šiauliai Air Base which is a major military facility of the Lithuanian Air Force and one of the air bases of the NATO Baltic Air Policing mission.

History 

Zokniai area was first used as an aerial warfare facility in 1916–1917, when the German forces built hangars for their Zeppelin airships.
Lithuanian Air Force began expanding during the Interwar period, as the country was acquiring foreign aircraft as well as domestically produced ANBO-series aircraft, making the Kaunas
aerodrome insufficient. In 1931, Zokniai aerodrome was built as a second airbase for the Lithuanian Air Force. It was a base of the 3rd, 4th and 5th squadrons. At that time, it was able to host 35 aircraft, including Ansaldo A.120, Letov Š-20, Gloster Gladiator, de Havilland Dragon Rapide and the domestically produced ANBO 41. For a brief time, the aerodrome hosted Lituanica II.

The concrete runways were first built during the German occupation in 1943. Following the Soviet occupation of Lithuania, the aerodrome was taken over by the Soviet forces. It was also one of only six Soviet airbases capable of handling the Myasishchev M-4 bomber. Following the independence restoration in 1991, the airport was soon returned to the Lithuanian Air Force.

In 1990s, it was renovated and also equipped for civilian operations. In 1994, Šiauliai Airport gained the status of international airport. It was further modernized in 2004 when Lithuania joined NATO. It became a NATO air base, hosting the Baltic Air Policing mission, with the first NATO F-16 jet fighters from the Belgian Air Component landing on 29 March 2004.

Facilities 

The airport is owned and administered by the Lithuanian Armed Forces.

Military base 

Officially Lithuanian Air Force Air Base, more commonly known as Šiauliai Air Base, is the headquarters of the Lithuanian Air Force since nearly all its aircraft operate out of it, including C-27J Spartan transporters and Eurocopter AS365 Dauphin helicopters. The base has Air Force Armament and Equipment Repair Depot. In 2020, around 400 military and civilian staff worked in the air base.

NATO Baltic Air Policing mission provides airspace security for the three Baltic members of NATO, including Quick Reaction Alert. The base hosted a variety of aircraft from the NATO allies, including the fifth-generation fighters F-22 Raptor and F-35 Lightning II as well as other types of aircraft, such as KC-135 Stratotanker and E-3 Sentry (AWACS).

Civilian facilities 

The civilian use is primarily for the aircraft maintenance and cargo transportation. The airport also has a passenger terminal, meeting the requirements of the Schengen Area, but it is used only for the irregular flights. Since the airport is also a military facility, it is not subject to noise regulations and is open 24 hours a day.

Šiauliai Airport is a regional centre for the aircraft maintenance and parking, with several companies operating in the airport, including "J&C Aero" and "Aviatic MRO". Runways have a capacity to accept larger aircraft, such as Boeing 747 or Airbus 330.

The airport has infrastructure for storage and customs and has been expanding its commercial cargo operations.

Gallery

See also 
 Ämari Air Base
 Lielvārde Air Base

References

External links 

 
 

Airports in Lithuania
Lithuanian Air Force bases
Buildings and structures in Šiauliai